Distributor may refer to:
 Distributor, part of the ignition system of an internal combustion engine
 Any person or company engaged in distribution (marketing)
 A wholesaling distributor (jobber), which buys from manufacturers and sells to retailers
 Film distributor
 Record distributor
 Distributor (category theory) in category theory, also known as a profunctor
 Eastern Distributor and Western Distributor (Sydney), freeways in Sydney, Australia
 Distributor (HBC vessel), built 1924, see Hudson's Bay Company vessels

See also
 Distribution (disambiguation)